Janq'u Qullu (Aymara janq'u white, qullu mountain, "white mountain", also spelled Jankho Kkollu) is a  mountain in the Cordillera Occidental in the Andes of Bolivia. It is located in the Oruro Department, Mejillones Province, La Rivera Municipality. Janq'u Qullu lies southeast of  Laram Pukara and Taypi Qullu.

See also 
 P'isaqiri

References 

Mountains of Oruro Department